Combo Niños is a French animated television series created by SIP Animation in collaboration with Jetix Europe and TF1, aimed towards the 6–10 years old audience. The series is about the adventures of 4 juvenile capoeira practitioners with the mission to protect the city of Nova Nizza from attack by mystical creatures from another dimension called "Divinos".

The Combo Niños have the ability to transform into mystical beings in anthropomorphic animal form by touching one of the totems that appear on the creatures. This form gives them unique skills that serve them in the battle against the Divinos and to perform special attacks called Big Blastico, used to return a Divino back to its own dimension.

Setting
The series takes place in an environment similar to Latin American countries, but especially Peru, Brazil, Colombia, and Mexico. This is evidenced by clothing, food, and names, as well as the use of the Capoeira style of fighting.  Also, some characters play a sport called Novanoc that parodies the ancient game of the Mayans, the pok-ta-pok.

Characters

The children
The children are the Combo 4, each of them being 11 years old: Serio, Paco, Azul and Pilar.

 Serio: His totem is the Tigrillo. Serio is quiet, yet is quite charismatic. He likes poetry and art, but sometimes he does not like to admit it and does not boast of their abilities. He is funny and sassy, and he is secretly in love with Azul, but is afraid to declare his love. When he becomes the Tigrillo his skills are: speed, agility, and strength in his claws.
 Paco: His totem is the Bull. Paco is competitive and tough, although at times he shows great pride and likes to show off, especially in his favorite sport, Novanoc. Paco becomes somewhat shy and has very bad temper when annoyed by something, and is occasionally foolish but is a very nice person and a good friend. When he becomes the Bull, Toro, his abilities are superhuman strength, capable of demolishing a building and cause waves sound clash, besides being very big.
 Azul: Her totem is the Eagle. Azul is quiet and serious, likes fashion and is intuitive, but she becomes quite bossy. Azul has a device for the detection and location of the Divino call DivinoBerry and battles. As the most intelligent, she plans how to stop and catch the Divinos. Azul doesn't know Serio likes her but, over time, she falls for him too. She has a phobia of insects and snakes (in the cases of Insecto Gigante and Mama Conda respectively). When turned into the Eagle, her skills are: Fly, cause powerful gusts of wind, bird control and produce high pitched sonic sounds.
 Pilar: Her totem is the Iguana. Pilar is eccentric, cheerful, likes many strange things, including eating things like insects, seafood and even some plants, although her favorite food is frozen pistachio nuts and blackberries. Pilar is very different from the others, especially when dancing or playing instruments. Sometimes she becomes insecure. In addition to being innocent she is very easily distracted, even in battles, but still can occasionally have ideas that help in the battle, even if her plans seem somewhat crazy. When she becomes Iguana, her skills are elasticity in many parts of her body.

The Masters
The children are mentored in their activities by "The Masters".

 Master Grinto is the teacher of the Combo Niños in terms of capoeira and the fight against the Divinos.  He was formerly a Combo boy himself; his totem is the Monkey. The children rely heavily on Grinto, especially in problems they have in their lives. He helps by encouraging them and showing them the right way, and usually always mentions the phrase "Don't you think? I think." He works as a librarian at the school where they study.
 Old Head is another combo Master of the children, and was formerly also a Combo and Grinto's teacher. His totem is Dragon Wing. Old Head is quite literally just a head, because while he coached Grinto in a battle against a Divino, he ended up going to the Divino's world, and as punishment for being a teacher, his body was completely converted into a stone head. Yet he retains his life and supports Grint in training the Combo Niños, although his character is somewhat rough and wants to impose the classical, or 'old-school' form of training. His real name is Bernie.

Divinos 
The mystical creatures from another world that previously have been in the world of humans but caused chaos and disaster, until they were returned to their own world. Most of them seek conquest of the world of humans but are trapped in their world. Unfortunately, Diadoro's ambition has led them back to return to the world of humans, and although Diodorus wants them to follow his orders, they ignore him, though some are interested in helping him until it's time to break free and try again to conquer the world by themselves. The Divinos each display one of the Four totem symbols on their body that, when touched by the child with the corresponding animal, allows them to transform into their Animal Forms.

Other characters 
 Diadoro was previously the mayor of Nova Nizza, but because of his lust for power, he ended up losing in the last elections. He looks for ways to oust the Mayor and regain his title, so, with the help of his assistant Gomez, look for portals where they can invoke the Divinos they need to oust the Mayor, but always ends up losing, because the Divinos often betray him and don't follow his orders.
 Gomez is a scientist who knows where to locate all the portals of the Divinos and how to invoke them for help as ordered by his boss, Diadoro. He's always inventing gadgets to summon the Divinos, and also to try to control them, at which he always ultimately fails. Even if he is little more than a slave to Diodorus, Gomez always supports him.
 Miss Solidad is the teacher of the school where the Combo Children study. She is quiet, nice and likes to teach children, even using some games and having fun with them, but is limited by Director Bronka because he thinks she does not teach the children properly.
 Director Bronka is the director of the school. He is gruff and strict, insisting that the children are 'properly' educated, no matter what happens outside or how well teachers teach, especially with Miss Solidad.
 Mayor Ruelas is the Mayor of Nova Nizza and almost every time Diadoro is defeated she finds a way to discredit him further than he already is.
 Michael is a school boy and a fan of the Combo Niños, even without knowing that his classmates are the Combos.
 Millie is a school girl and Michael's greatest friend. She gets along very well with everyone and is cheerful.
 Ralph is a school boy and even though he's in a wheelchair he is an excellent player of Novanok, and also makes piñatas.
 Telmo is another companion of the Combo Niños. He is Paco's great rival and buddy of Pearl.
 Pearl is a school girl who is very rich. Believes she is the best and spends his days annoying everyone, especially Pilar, because she is jealous of her.

Episodes

Production 
Combo Niños was produced by French animation studio SIP Animation, with animation work done by the Malaysian studio .

The series was originally announced in October 2004, with delivery planned for the first quarter of 2006, and an expected budget of approximately US$370,000 per episode. At the time, the character of Diadoro was envisioned as a "down-on-his-luck e-trader".

Broadcast 
Besides Jetix in Europe and Latin America, the series has also been broadcast on several other networks.
 In Australia, since a Jetix Channel doesn't exist in the country, the show aired on free-to-air services Seven Network and 7TWO (which Disney had a partnership with Seven's parent company for many years).
In France, the series aired on TF1 (on the TFOU block) before Disney XD (Jetix France rebranded months after the show's premiere on the channel), due to the fact they co-produced the show. The show would premiere on Disney XD in December 2009.
In the United Kingdom, as well as Jetix, the series aired on the GMTV-owned (Which Disney held a 25% stake in at the time) Toonattik strand, which itself aired on ITV1 and CITV.
In Turkey and Romania, the show aired on Kanal D.
In the Middle East, the show aired on MBC 3, who aired other Jetix programming.

Reception 
The series has been appraised as part of a well-needed fresh wave of television programming at the time. The concept of introducing young viewers to capoeira via an animated medium has been viewed positively, though some aspects were criticized as not ideal.

References 

2008 French television series debuts
2008 French television series endings
2000s French animated television series
French children's animated action television series
French flash animated television series
Jetix original programming
Animated television series about children